Louise Latimer may refer to:

 Louise Latimer (actress) (1913–1973), American actress
 Louise Latimer (tennis) (born 1978), British tennis player
 Louise Payson Latimer (1878–1962), American librarian and author